Émile Rigaud (1824-1890) was a French lawyer and politician. He served as the Mayor of Aix-en-Provence from 1849 to 1863 and as a member of the National Assembly from 1852 to 1862.

Biography

Early life
(Joseph) Émile Rigaud was born on 27 March 1824 in Pourrières. His father, Jean-Joseph Rigaud, was a notary. He had a brother, Constantin Michel Rigaud, and two sisters, Marie Léontine Rigaud and Marie Claire Rigaud.

Career
He started his career as a lawyer. He served as President of the Court of Appeals of Aix in 1862.

He attended a salon in Aix started by Polish-born Constantin Gaszinski, the editor of Le Mémorial d'Aix, a bi-weekly newspaper. He decided to embark upon a career in politics and joined the Parti de l'Ordre, an Orleanist and Legitimist conservative political party. He served as the Mayor of Aix-en-Provence from 1849 to 1863. During his tenure, he oversaw the construction of the Gare d'Aix-en-Provence in 1856 and the Fontaine de la Rotonde in 1860. He then served as a member of the National Assembly from 1852 to 1862.

Personal life
He resided in a hôtel particulier located at number 16 on the Cours Mirabeau in Aix. In 1858, he also purchased the Château de la Mignarde in Aix-en-Provence from Sauveur Mignard, where he resided until his death. In August 1863, he married Rose Ernestine de Roccas. They had a son:
Paul Rigaud. He ran for Mayor in Trets but lost.

He died on 19 March 1890 in Aix-en-Provence. His descendants still live in the Château de la Mignarde.

References

1824 births
1890 deaths
People from Var (department)
Politicians from Provence-Alpes-Côte d'Azur
Bonapartists
Members of the 1st Corps législatif of the Second French Empire
Members of the 2nd Corps législatif of the Second French Empire
Mayors of Aix-en-Provence
19th-century French lawyers
Commandeurs of the Légion d'honneur